Melvin George Coogan (August 6, 1896 – December 27, 1957) was an American boxer from Brooklyn. He was undefeated in his first nine fights with a record of 7-0-9.

Coogan fought Frankie Callahan in Brooklyn, New York. but lost by decision. He fought Johnny Dundee in Jersey City, New Jersey, where he won by decision. He also fought Lew Tendler. Both fighters fought to a no contest in Philadelphia, Pennsylvania. From 1914 to 1919 he had a record of 65-7-10. Coogan never had a title shot.

External links
 http://www.boxrec.com/list_bouts.php?human_id=11922&cat=boxer&pageID=1
 http://www.boxrec.com/media/index.php?title=Human:11922
 Mel Coogan's obituary

1896 births
1957 deaths
Boxers from New York City
Sportspeople from Brooklyn
American male boxers
Lightweight boxers